Drymaeus dakryodes is a species of  tropical air-breathing land snail, a pulmonate gastropod mollusc in the family Bulimulidae.

References

Drymaeus
Gastropods described in 2015